The City Wall of Hyderabad was a city wall surrounding Hyderabad, although the city has expanded significantly beyond the wall. The wall used to enclose the area of present Old City of Hyderabad.

Due to encroachment and neglect on part of the authorities, almost all of the wall has been destroyed, although portions still survive at Aliabad. Two of the original thirteen gateways still stand.

Construction 

The construction of the wall was started by Abul Hasan Qutb Shah, the last Sultan of the Qutb Shahi dynasty. The construction continued under Mubariz Khan, the Mughal governor of the Deccan. The construction was completed by the first Nizam.

Historians say that the wall varied in thickness, as it crossed various locations. Some places were wide enough for sentries, while other places could even accommodate horses. At strategic points, where there could be threats, there was an opening for canons to be mounted.

The wall initially had 13 gates, known as Darwazas. In addition to the large gates, at certain points the walls also had smaller entrances  known as khidkis or windows, through which one could enter the city. The thirteen gates were:

 Purana Pul Darwaza (surviving) at Purana Pul.
 Dabeerpura Darwaza (surviving) at Dabirpura.
 Chaderghat Darwaza at Chaderghat.
 Yakutpura Darwaza at Yakutpura.
 Aliabad Darwaza at Aliabad.
 Champa Darwaza
 Lal Darwaza
 Gowlipura Darwaza
 Fateh Darwaza
 Doodhbowli Darwaza
 Dilli Darwaza
 Mir Jumla Darwaza
 Afzal Darwaza, the last of the gates built in 1861 by Afzal ad-Dawlah, Asaf Jah V.

Remains 

Much of the wall was destroyed during the Great Musi Flood of 1908, and later demolished by the government after independence in the 1950s and 1960s.

Today, only two gates still stand — the Purana Pul Darwaza and the Dabeerpura Darwaza, and nothing except a few portions remains of the wall.

Gallery

References

Citations

Bibliography

Culture of Hyderabad, India
Hyderabad
History of Hyderabad, India
Buildings and structures in Hyderabad, India
City walls in India